Garros may refer to:

People
 Boris Garrós (born 1988), Spanish soccer player
 Cristina Garros Martínez, Argentine judge
 Christian Garros (1930–1988), French jazz musician 
 Pey de Garros (1530–1585), Occitan poet
 Roland Garros (aviator) (1888–1918), a pioneering aviator and WWI pilot for France

Places
 Garros (township), Staffin, Highland, Scotland, UK
 Roland Garros Airport, Sainte-Marie, Reunion, France
 Stade Roland Garros, Paris, Ile-de-France, France
 Garros Galería, Colonia Roma, Mexico City, Mexico

Other uses
 Roland-Garros, or, the French Open of tennis

See also

 
 O'Garro (surname) 
 Garro (disambiguation) 
 Roland Garros (disambiguation)